Alexandre Manuel Vahia de Castro O'Neill de Bulhões, GOSE (19 December 1924, in Lisbon – 21 August 1986, in Lisbon) was a Portuguese writer and poet of Irish descent.

Family
He was born at 39 Fontes Pereira de Melo Avenue the son of José António Pereira de Eça O'Neill (Lisbon, c. 1890 – ?), a bank worker, and wife Maria da Glória Vahia de Barros de Castro (17 March 1905 – aft. October 1989), and paternal grandson of writer, poet, conferencewoman and journalist Maria O'Neill. His ancestor João O'Neill (Irish: Seán Ó Néill) had emigrated from Ireland in 1740.

He had an older sister, Maria Amélia Vahia de Castro O'Neill de Bulhões, who became a Nun.

Career
He was a self-taught person and worked as a publicity professional.

Surrealist and concretist poet and writer, and a publicist, who collaborated in many periodicals.

In 1948, O'Neill was among the founders of the Lisbon Surrealist Movement, along with Mário Cesariny de Vasconcelos, José-Augusto França and others. His writings soon diverged from Surrealist to form an original style whose poetry reflects a love/hate relationship with his country.

His salient characteristics – a disrespect of conventions, both social and literary, an attitude of permanent revolt, playfulness with language, and the use of parody and black humor – are used to form a body of incisive depictions of what is to be Portuguese and his relation with the country.

Although most of his works have been lost or are missing or in private collections some of his work was displayed in 2002 at an exhibit on the Surrealist movement.

O'Neill was in permanent conflict with Portugal. While other contemporaries wrote poems that protested against national life under Salazar, O'Neill's attack ran deeper. Poems such as Standing at Fearful Attention and Portugal suggested that the dictatorial regime was a symptom (the worst symptom) of graver ills – lack of courage and smallness of vision – woven into the nation's psyche. Other poems, such as Lament of the Man Who Misses Being Blind, seemed to hold religion and mysticism responsible for an obscurantism that made change difficult if not impossible.

A publicist by profession, famed for inventing some of the most ingenious advertising slogans of his time, O'Neill was unusually adept at manipulating words and using them in an efficacious manner, but he refused to put that talent at the service of a lyrically lofty, feel-good sort of poetry (see 'Simply Expressive').

Stridently anti-Romantic, concerned to keep humanity in its place as just one of Earth's species, he did not believe that an especially harmonious world was possible, and he abhorred all attempts to escape the world, whether through mystical or poetical exaltations. His one hope, or consolation, explicitly stated in St. Francis's Empty Sandal, was in the connection (never entirely peaceful) he felt with other members of the species.

Decorations
He was awarded the degree of Grand Officer of the Order of Saint James of the Sword.

Marriages and children
He married firstly on 27 December 1957 and divorced on 15 January 1971 television and film screenwriter, editor and director Noémia Delgado. The couple had a son:
 Alexandre Delgado O'Neill (Lisbon, 23 December 1959 – Lisbon, Portugal, 4 January 1993), a photographer, unmarried and without issue

He married secondly in Lisbon on 4 August 1971 and divorced on 20 February 1981 politician Teresa Patrício de Gouveia. The couple had a son:
 Afonso de Gouveia O'Neill (born 28 May 1976), unmarried and without issue

Filmography
 Las Hurdes aka Las Hurdes, tierra sin pan (Spain: long title) or Tierra sin pan (Spain: short title) or Land Without Bread (International: English title) (1933) .... Himself – Voice
 Dom Roberto (1962) Author of Poems
 Pássaros de Asas Cortadas aka Birds with Clipped Wings (International: English title) (1963) Author of the Dialogue
 Sete Balas Para Selma (1967) Author of Poem
 Águas Vivas (1969) .... Narrator and also Film writer
 A Grande Roda (1970) Film writer
 Sever do Vouga... Uma Experiência (1971) .... Narrator
 Schweik na Segunda Guerra Mundial (1975) (TV) Author of Poems
 Cantigamente (3 episodes, "#1.1", "#1.2" and "#1.3", 1976) Television writer
 Máscaras (1976) .... Narrator
 Nós por cá Todos Bem (1978) Author of Poem "Coro das Criadas de Servir"
 Ninguém (1979) (TV) Television writer
 Lisboa (1979) (TV) Television writer
 Prata da Casa (unknown episodes, 1980) .... Himself as Jury Member

References

External links

 
 Alexandre O'Neill's Genealogy in a Portuguese Genealogical site

1924 births
1986 deaths
People from Lisbon
Portuguese anti-fascists
Portuguese people of Irish descent
Portuguese male poets
20th-century Portuguese poets
20th-century male writers